AzeriCard is an Azerbaijani bank card processing company. The International Bank of Azerbaijan owns 100 percent of AzeriCard.

Products

Mobile Wallet
 AzeriCard offers customers what is known as a “mobile wallet." Customers can use their smartphone to pull out cash from ATMs without using an actual bank card during the transaction. The technology is named “Way4 Cash By Code." 
 AzeriCard worked with technology company OpenWay to produce the mobile wallet service.
 By 2011, 15 banks in Azerbaijan were using mobile banking technology provided by AzeriCard.

Market share
 As of 2016 November-end, 35% of plastic cards, 65% of ATMs and 62% of point-of-sale terminals in Azerbaijan are served by AzeriCard. 
 Currently, more than twenty banks locally and internationally use the services of AzeriCard.

Competitors
As of the beginning of 2017, there are two other companies in addition to AzeriCard that provide card processing services: MilliKart and KapitalBank.

History

First bank card
 In 1997 AzeriCard was credited with creating the very first bank card in the country of Azerbaijan; the card was issued by the International Bank of Azerbaijan. 
 AzeriCard’s systems work with MasterCard, Visa, American Express, Diners Club, UnionPay and JCB International.

Ownership
 AzeriCard is one of several subsidiaries of the International Bank of Azerbaijan. Other subsidiaries are:.
 IBA-Moscow  
 International Bank of Azerbaijan-Georgia  
 International Insurance Company  
 In addition to the International Bank of Azerbaijan, AzeriCard works directly with IBA-Moscow and IBA-Georgia.

Customers
Banks that use AzeriCard’s services are:  
 AGBank 
 Amrahbank 
 AtaBank 
 Bank Respublika 
 International Bank of Azerbaijan 
 PASHA Bank 
 Nikoil Bank
 Ziraat Bank Azerbaijan 
 Silk Way Bank 
 TuranBank 
 Xalq Bank
 AFB Bank
 Azer-Turk Bank
 Bank Avrasiya
 Bank BTB
 NBC Bank
 Caspian Development Bank
 MuganBank
 Rabitabank
 VTB Bank Azerbaijan
 KDB Bank Uzbekistan

See also
 Banking in Azerbaijan
 Credit card
 International Bank of Azerbaijan
 List of companies of Azerbaijan

References

External links
 AzeriCard company website
 International Bank of Azerbaijan website

Banking in Azerbaijan
Financial services companies of Azerbaijan
Payment card services companies